

Dinosaurs
 Charles Gilmore returned to prospect for fossils in the Two Medicine Formation. He would return yet again in 1935.

Newly named dinosaurs
Data courtesy of George Olshevsky's dinosaur genera list.

Plesiosaurs

New taxa

Pterosaurs

New taxa

Synapsids

Non-mammalian

Footnotes

References
 Trexler, D., 2001, Two Medicine Formation, Montana: geology and fauna: In:  Mesozoic Vertebrate Life, edited by Tanke, D. H., and Carpenter, K., Indiana  University Press, pp. 298–309.

1920s in paleontology
Paleontology
Paleontology 8